Momentum is a studio album released by jazz pianist Dave Burrell. It was recorded in November 2005 and released a year later on November 14, 2006 by the label High Two.

The first three tracks on the album were originally composed by Burrell to accompany the restored French silent film Body and Soul (1925) directed by Oscar Micheaux.

Reception 

All About Jazz reviewer Troy Collins comments that "Burrell hones in on the jazz tradition with intensity and focus, delivering one of the finest statements of his career". AllMusic reviewer Stewart Mason describes the album as "spiky and challenging but only rarely moving into the rhythmic and tonal fearlessness of some of his more outside work".

Track listing 
 "Downfall" — 5:49
 "Broken Promise" — 5:29
 "Fade to Black" — 5:53
 "4:30 to Atlanta" — 6:07
 "Cool Reception" — 8:55
 "Momentum" — 5:06
 "Coup d'État" — 5:58

Personnel 
Band:
 Dave Burrell — piano
 Guillermo E. Brown — drums
 Michael Formanek — double bass

Production:
 Shawn Brackbill — photography
 Flam — mastering
 Jon Rosenberg — engineer

References 

Dave Burrell albums
2006 live albums